McCaslin is a surname. Notable people with the surname include:

Bob McCaslin Jr. (born 1957), American politician
Bob McCaslin Sr. (1926–2011), American politician
Donny McCaslin (born 1966), American jazz saxophonist
Eugene McCaslin (born 1977), American football player
Jason McCaslin (born 1980), Canadian musician
John McCaslin (born 1957), American talk radio host and writer
Mary McCaslin (born 1946), American folk singer
Matthew McCaslin (born 1957), American artist
Richard McCaslin (1964–2018), American criminal
Susan McCaslin (born 1947), Canadian poet

See also
McCaslin Airport, an airport in Cleveland County, Oklahoma, United States
McCaslin Nunatak, a nunatak of Antarctica